At least three ships of the Hellenic Navy have borne the name Niki ("Victory"):

 , a  launched in 1906 and stricken in 1945.
 , a  launched in 1942 as USS Eberle she was transferred to Greece in 1951 and renamed. She was scrapped in 1972.
 , a  commissioned in the German Navy in 1961 as Thetis she was transferred to Greece in 1991 and renamed. She was decommissioned in 2009.

Hellenic Navy ship names